Alexander Kazimirovich Tolush (1 May 1910 – 3 March 1969) was a Soviet chess grandmaster.  He was one of Boris Spassky's mentors. Tolush was born and died in Saint Petersburg (in 1969 called Leningrad). He earned the title of International Master (IM) in 1950, Grandmaster (GM) in 1953, and International Master of Correspondence Chess (IMC) in 1965.

Tournament career
Tolush won the Leningrad Championship in 1937 (joint), 1938, 1946, and 1947 (joint).
He played in the USSR Championship ten times. His best result was second place (+8−3=6 shared with Aronin and Lipnitsky) behind Keres in 1950. He finished fourth in 1952 (+8−4=7, equal with Boleslavsky and behind Botvinnik, Taimanov, and Geller) and fourth 1957 (+10−5=6 equal with Spassky and behind Tal, Bronstein, and Keres).

His best international result was first place (+10−1=8) at Bucharest 1953, ahead of Petrosian, Smyslov, Boleslavsky, and Spassky. In 1968 he was second at Keszthely +7−1=3 behind Portisch.
Tolush never played in the Olympiads, but represented the USSR in two European Team Chess Championships.

Legacy
Although he never reached the very highest level of chess, Tolush was an imaginative attacking player. He worked as a chess journalist, and was a noted trainer whose pupils included Keres and Spassky. His biography Alexander Tolush (1983) was compiled by his wife Valentina and includes 92 games.

Tolush introduced the Tolush–Geller Gambit of the Slav Defense to master play in the games Tolush–Smyslov USSR Championship 1947, and Tolush–Levenfish Leningrad Championship 1947.

References

Further reading
British Chess Magazine, 1969, p. 116
Shakhmatny Bulletin, 1969, pp. 146–150

External links
 
 Alexander Tolush at OlimpBase.org (European Team Championship results)
 

1910 births
1969 deaths
Chess grandmasters
Russian chess players
Soviet chess players
Russian chess writers
Chess coaches
Burials at Bogoslovskoe Cemetery
20th-century chess players